En un burro tres baturros ("Three Peasants on a Donkey") is a 1939 Mexican film directed by José Benavides, Jr and is based on the play written by Alberto Novión. It stars Carlos Orellana and Sara García and is Pedro Infante's first film, appearing as an extra. Infante was also asked to overdub the singing for the jota, in place of Carlos López Moctezuma (who plays Alfredo).

Plot 
The film begins in Camarillas, the province of Teruel in the Aragon region of Spain. Three young men baturros (Aragonese peasants), Santiago, Isidro and El Perico, embark on a journey to Mexico to find better opportunities for themselves.  Santiago and Isidro are initially unable to convince El Perico to join them on their trip as his wife is pregnant and he is in poor health. El Perico's wife dies diving birth to their daughter, La Pilar which causes him to decide at the last minute to go with them to Mexico. After they arrive in Mexico, El Perico becomes ill, and just before dying he makes Santiago promise to be a father to La Pilar. Santiago and Isidro send for the girlfriends, Manuela and Antonia and marrying them by proxy, who bring La Pilar with them to Mexico.

Cast 
 Carlos Orellana as Santiago Míguez
 Joaquín Pardavé as Isidro Herráiz
 José Pidal as El Perico
 Sara García as Manuela
 Carlos López Moctezuma as Alfredo
 Victoria Alonso as La Pilara
 Jorge Mairoz as Ramon
 Conchita Gentil Arcos as Antonia Teruel
 Elvia Salcedo as Laurita
 Joaquín Coss as Padre de Santiago
 Consuelo Segarra as Agustina - Madre de Isidro
 Alfredo Varela as Sirviente de Santiago
 Hernán Vera as Juéz en Aragón
 Víctor Junco as Amigo de Alfredo en juerga
 Victoria Arcos
 Manuel Pozos
 Pedro Infante

References

External links
 
 

1939 films
1930s Spanish-language films
Mexican black-and-white films
Mexican comedy films
1939 comedy films
1930s Mexican films